Berserk Bear (aka Crouching Yeti, Dragonfly, Dragonfly 2.0, DYMALLOY, Energetic Bear, Havex, IRON LIBERTY, Koala, or TeamSpy) is a Russian cyber espionage group, sometimes known as an advanced persistent threat. According to the United States, the group is composed of "FSB hackers," either those directly employed by the FSB or Russian civilian, criminal hackers coerced into contracting as FSB hackers while still freelancing or moonlighting as criminal hackers. Four accused Berserk Bear participants, three FSB staff and one civilian, have been indicted in the United States and are regarded by the United States Department of Justice as fugitives.

Activities
Berserk Bear specializes in compromising utilities infrastructure, especially that belonging to companies responsible for water or energy distribution. It has performed these activities in at least Germany and the U.S. These operations are targeted towards surveillance and technical reconnaissance.

Berserk Bear has also targeted many state, local, and tribal government and aviation networks in the U.S., and as of October 1, 2020, had exfiltrated data from at least two victim servers. In particular, Berserk Bear is believed to have infiltrated the computer network of the city of Austin, Texas, during 2020.

The group is capable of producing its own advanced malware, although it sometimes seeks to mimic other hacking groups and conceal its activities.

Indictments unsealed 2022
In 2021 federal grand juries in the United States indicted three personnel of the Russian Federal Security Service (FSB) and a civilian from the Central Research Institute of Chemistry and Mechanics (CNIIHM). These indictments were kept under seal until March 2022 when the United States publicly named the defendants and treated them as fugitives.

Evgeny Gladkikh
Evgeny Gladkikh: is accused of targeting network-connected safety equipment with the intent to gain the capability to sabotage them. He was indicted in the U.S. District Court for the District of Columbia

"Center 16" defendants
The indictment in the case United States v. Akulov, et al. is focused on members of a team within "Center 16" an FSB component also known as Military Unit 71330.

The British Foreign Office states that the full name of Center 16 is "Radio-Electronic Intelligence by Means of Communication" (TsRRSS); 

The U.S. v. Akulov case was filed within the United States District Court for the District of Kansas. The named defendants are:
 Pavel Aleksandrovich Akulov (b. 2 July 1985) is described as a military officer assigned to Military Unit 71330, who held the rank of lieutenant as of 2013. Akulov is described as conducting surveillance and reconnaissance supporting the targeting of the Wolf Creek Generating Station computer network.
 Mikhail Mikhailovich Gavrilov (b. 7 November 1979) is described as Russian military intelligence officer assigned to Military Unit 71330. He has held the rank of captain and major. He is described as conducting computer intrusions into the computer networks of Wolf Creek and another unnamed entity ("Company 7") used to access energy, utility and critical infrastructure webmail login webpages.
 Marat Valeryevich Tyukov (b. 17 November 1982) is described as a Russian military intelligence officer assigned to Military Unit 71330. He is alleged to have gained unauthorized access to a server owned by an unnamed entity ("Company One") that was used for command and control infrastructure. He is also accused of tampering with updates to industrial control software which affected power and energy companies globally.

FBI and Department of State designation
The U.S. State Department Rewards for Justice Program is offering $10 million for tips leading that lead to the apprehension of the four named "Berserk Bear" suspects.

See also
2020 United States federal government data breach
Cozy Bear
Fancy Bear

References

Hacking in the 2020s
Information technology in Russia
Russian advanced persistent threat groups
Cybercrime
Cyberwarfare
Fugitives wanted by the United States